Dioptis is a genus of moths of the family Notodontidae. It consists of the following species:
Dioptis aeliana  Bates, 1862
Dioptis angustifascia  Hering, 1925
Dioptis areolata  Walker, 1854
Dioptis beckeri  Miller, 2008
Dioptis butes  (Druce, 1885) 
Dioptis candelaria  Druce, 1885
Dioptis charila  Druce, 1893
Dioptis charon  Druce, 1893
Dioptis cheledonis  Druce, 1893
Dioptis chloris  Druce, 1893
Dioptis climax  Prout, 1918
Dioptis columbiana  Hering, 1925
Dioptis curvifascia  Prout, 1918
Dioptis cyma  Hübner, 1818
Dioptis dentistriga  Hering, 1925
Dioptis egla  Druce, 1893
Dioptis eteocles  (Druce, 1885) 
Dioptis fatima  (Möschler, 1877) 
Dioptis fratelloi  Miller, 2008
Dioptis ilerdina  Bates, 1862
Dioptis incerta  Hering, 1925
Dioptis indentata  Hering, 1925
Dioptis leucothyris  (Butler, 1876) 
Dioptis longipennis  (Schaus, 1913) 
Dioptis meon  (Cramer, 1775) 
Dioptis nigrivenis  Hering, 1925
Dioptis obliquaria  (Warren, 1905) 
Dioptis onega  Bates, 1862
Dioptis otanes  Druce, 1893
Dioptis pallene  Druce, 1893
Dioptis paracyma  Prout, 1918
Dioptis pellucida  Warren, 1901
Dioptis peregrina  Hering, 1925
Dioptis phelina  C. and R. Felder, 1874
Dioptis proix  Prout, 1918
Dioptis restricta  Warren, 1901
Dioptis roraima  Druce, 1893
Dioptis stenothyris  Prout, 1918
Dioptis subalbata  (Dognin, 1904) 
Dioptis tessmanni  Hering, 1925
Dioptis trailii  (Butler, 1877) 
Dioptis uniguttata  Warren, 1901
Dioptis vacuata  Warren, 1905
Dioptis vitrifera  Warren, 1905
Dioptis zarza  (Dognin, 1894) 

Notodontidae
Moths of South America